Francesca Lebrun (née Danzi; 24 March 1756 – 14 May 1791) was a noted 18th-century German singer and composer. Her talent extended beyond the stage to music composition and keyboard performance. As a composer, her twelve sonatas, six each in opus 1 and opus 2, for piano or harpsichord with violin accompaniment, were first published in London, England, in 1779–1781, with further editions in London, Paris, and several German centers. The opus 1 sonatas are available in commercial recording.

Early life 
She was born Franziska Dorothea Danzi in Mannheim, Germany. Her father was the Italian-born cellist Innocenz Danzi and her younger brother was the composer and cellist Franz Danzi (1763–1826). She was renowned for her vocal dexterity and highly sought after by notable contemporaries, such as Anton Schweitzer, Ignaz Holzbauer, and Antonio Salieri, for the lead roles in their most challenging operas.

Francesca was the eldest child in the family of gifted musicians. Her mother (Barbara Sidonia Margaretha Toeschi), a dancer, and her father (Innocenz Danzi), an Italian cellist, were the core of the elite elector Mannheim court performers in the late 1750s. Her brothers, Franz (Ignaz) and Johann Baptist, were cellist and violinist respectively and were successful composers. Karl Joseph (Carlo Giuseppe) Toeschi, a violinist, composer and conductor, was her maternal uncle.

Career 
She made her first public appearance as a singer at the age of 16 and the following year was engaged by the Mannheim Opera. There seems to be some debate whether she first performed in Gassmann's L’amore artigiano in May 1772, or Sacchini's La Contadina in Corte, the role for which she earned the title of court musician (virtuosa da camera). She stayed with the Mannheim court opera for four years and was cast in the premier roles: Parthenia in Anton Schweitzer's Alceste (1775, Schlosstheater Schwetzingen), and Anna in Holzbauer's Günther von Schwarzburg (1777), a role composed specifically for her voice. At twenty-one, she travelled to London to sing four-opera series by J.C. Bach & Sacchini.

In 1778, she married the oboe virtuoso and composer Ludwig August Lebrun (1752–1790) from Mannheim. That summer, now known as Signora Lebrun, she toured Italy with Ludwig. At the opening of the Teatro Alla Scala in Milan on 3 August 1778, Francesca Lebrun was the female lead in Antonio Salieri's opera Europa Riconosciuta. She created a sensation in 1779 in Paris at the Concert Spirituel through her ability to fit Italian words to instrumental parts of symphonies concertantes and sing them. The Lebruns lived in London from 1779 through 1781 while Francesca appeared at the King's Theater. In 1780 the celebrated English artist Thomas Gainsborough painted her portrait.

A celebrated soprano, she sang on major operatic and concert stages through Europe, including England, Germany and Italy, to great acclaim. The musician and writer C.F.D. Schubart noted that she could sing A, three octaves above middle C with ‘clarity and distinctness’. Charles Burney wrote that when she and her husband performed divisions of thirds and sixths it was impossible to discover who was uppermost of the interval.

Francesca's family flourished as well, she gave birth to her daughter Sophie while in London in June 1781, and daughter Rosine in 1783 in Munich. Francesca and Ludwig toured around Europe again in 1785, spending a season in Naples, then Berlin and London where Ludwig died in 1790. She performed only twice after his death and survived him by only five months, dying on 14 May 1791 at the age of 35. She was born and died in the same years as Mozart, 1791.

Her daughters also became well-known. Rosine Lebrun (1783–1855) was a successful opera singer and actress and was a member of the Munich theatre company, 1801–1830. Sophie [Dülken] (1781–1863) became a well-known pianist and composer. Sophie's daughters and their daughters also became musicians.

Discography
 Six Sonatas for Fortepiano and Violin, Op. 1. Monica Jakuc (piano), Dana Maiben (violin). Dorian Discovery, 1996.
 Sonata for Piano and Violin, Op. 1, no 2, in E-flat Major. Jaroslav Sveceny (violin), Fine Zimmermann (harpsichord). Women Composers at the Courts Of Europe (Cybele Records, 2000). Both available at CD Universe. 
 Sonata for Violin and Piano, op. 1, no. 6 in D Major; Aleksandra Maslovaric (violin), Tania Fleischer (piano). Feminae in Musica, Feminae Records 2007. Available at Arkiv Music.

References

External links
 

1756 births
1791 deaths
German sopranos
German Classical-period composers
German women classical composers
German people of Italian descent
18th-century classical composers
18th-century German composers
Women classical composers
19th-century women composers
18th-century women composers